"My Projects" is the lead single released from Coo Coo Cal's second album, Disturbed.

The song was a moderate crossover hit, peaking at number 81 on the Billboard Hot 100, it was, however, a bigger success on the rap charts, reaching number one on the Billboard Hot Rap Singles. After the success of the original, a remix featuring Kurupt and Trick Daddy was released.

Single track listing

A-Side
"My Projects" - 3:47
"My Projects" (Clean) - 3:46

B-Side
"Dedication" - 4:29
"My Projects" (Instrumental) - 3:46

Charts

Peak positions

Year-End charts

References

2001 singles
Gangsta rap songs
2001 songs
Tommy Boy Records singles